This is a list of notable people who are from Nova Scotia, Canada, or have spent a large part or formative part of their career in that province.

Pre-Confederation
David H. Armstrong, United States Senator from Missouri, born in Nova Scotia
Alexander Graham Bell
Samuel Cunard
Noel Doiron
Charles Fenerty, inventor of wood pulp process for papermaking
Rose Fortune
Abraham Pineo Gesner, discovered kerosene oil
Jerome of Sandy Cove
Joseph Howe
Gordon Benjamin Isnor
 William Paget
Angus MacAskill, suffered gigantism, stood 7'9"
Joshua Slocum, first to sail solo around the world
 Richard John Uniacke
William Valentine

Military figures

17th-18th century 

See also:
 John Allan - American Revolution
 Pierre Maisonnat dit Baptiste - Queen Anne's War
 Joseph-Nicolas Gautier - Father Le Loutre's War
 John Gyles - King William's War
 John Handfield - Fort Vieux Logis
 Charles de Saint-Étienne de la Tour - Acadian Civil War
 Chief Madockawando - King William's War
 Father Pierre Maillard - Father Le Loutre's War
 Charles Morris - King George's War
 Pierre II Surette - French and Indian War

19th century 

See also:
 George Augustus Westphal - War of 1812

Post-Confederation military figures

Actors
Elliot Page
Chase Tang
Page Fletcher

Architects
Brian MacKay-Lyons

Artists
Mark A. Brennan
Alex Colville
William E. deGarthe
Maud Lewis
Gilbert Stuart Newton
Edith Smith
Michael Ernest Sweet
Christopher Webb

Cartoonists
Hal Foster

Diplomats
Audri Mukhopadhyay

Doctors 

 Clement Ligoure, first Black physician in Nova Scotia

Filmmakers
Mike Clattenburg
Phil Comeau
Paul Donovan
Jason Eisener
Thom Fitzgerald
Andrew Hines
Daniel MacIvor
Noah Pink

Industry
 Ezra Churchill
 Cyrus S. Eaton
 Alfred Fuller, founder of the Fuller Brush Company
 Alexander Keith, brewer
 John W. Sobey

Inventors
 Walter Harris Callow, inventor of wheelchair accessible bus
Charles Fenerty, inventor of wood pulp process for papermaking
Abraham Pineo Gesner, inventor of kerosene

Media 

 William Coates Borrett, founder of CHNS-FM, the province's first commercial radio station

Musicians

People
Brian Ahern (producer)
Carroll Baker (singer) Carroll Baker CM
Gary Beals
Buck 65
George Canyon,born Fredrick George Lays
Wilf Carter
Classified
Holly Cole
J. P. Cormier
Melanie Doane
Denny Doherty
Todd Fancey
Leslie Feist
J.D. Fortune
Bruce Guthro
Rebekah Higgs
Ashley MacIsaac
Natalie MacMaster
Kevin MacMichael
Rita MacNeil
Matt Mays
Sarah McLachlan
Matt Minglewood
Anne Murray
Joel Plaskett
Steve Poltz
Heather Rankin
Jimmy Rankin
Stan Rogers, from Ontario but lived in and sang about Nova Scotia
Gordie Sampson
Tara Slone
Laura Smith
Hank Snow
Scott Storch
Portia White
JRDN
Quake Matthews
JayTheKidd
Jody Upshaw

Bands
April Wine
The Barra MacNeils
The Rankin Family
Rawlins Cross
Sloan
The Trews

Religion
Henry Alline, the Apostle of Nova Scotia
Moses E. Kiley, Archbishop of the Roman Catholic Archdiocese of Milwaukee

Scientists
Donald O. Hebb
Abraham Pineo Gesner
Thomas Mason
Simon Newcomb
Willard Boyle

Sports

Sports announcers
Danny Gallivan
Paul Hollingsworth

Adventurers
Howard Blackburn
Joshua Slocum

Baseball players
Vince Horsman
Fred Lake

Boat racers
Angus Walters

Canoeists

Richard Dalton
Stephen Giles
Michael Scarola

Kayakers

Jillian D'Alessio
Karen Furneaux
Sue Holloway
Anne Dodge

Bodybuilders
Cindy Phillips

Boxers
Chris Clarke
Buddy Daye
George Dixon
Ray Downey
Bryan Gibson
Kirk Johnson
Sam Langford
Carroll Morgan
Marty O'Donnell
Randall Thompson

Curlers

Nasties
Shawn Adams
Mark Dacey, from Saskatoon but curls out of the Mayflower Curling Club
Andrew Gibson
Rob Harris
Bruce Lohnes

Hotties
Mary-Anne Arsenault
Nancy Delahunt, a Montrealer who has lived in Halifax for several years
Meredith Harrison
Colleen Jones
Kim Kelly
Jill Mouzar

Equestrians

Harness racing
Bill O'Donnell

Show jumping
Ian Millar

Football players

NFL players
Buck MacDonald
Eddie Murray
Tyrone Williams

CFL players
Tyrone Williams
Marty Martinello born in Sydney, N.S. Played in CFL, won Grey Cup with Hamilton Tiger-Cats. Named to N.S. Ports Hall of Fame.

Rugby union players

Morgan Williams

Soccer players

Stephen Hart
Ante Jazic
Jacob Shaffelburg

Gymnasts
Ellie Black

Ice hockey people

Administrators 

Frederick E. Betts, president of the Canadian Amateur Hockey Association
Hanson Dowell, president of the Canadian Amateur Hockey Association

Men 

Paul Andrea, 150 NHL games in the 1960s and 1970s
Drake Batherson
Dennis Bonvie
Eric Boulton
David Brine
John Brophy
Sidney Crosby
Mal Davis
Ryan Flinn
Danny Gallivan
William Hollett
Don Koharski
Craig MacDonald
Lowell MacDonald
Parker MacDonald
Al MacInnis, Hall of Famer
Nathan MacKinnon
Cail MacLean
Al MacNeil
Brad Marchand
Mike McPhee
Dean Melanson
Glen Murray
Pokey Reddick
Bill Riley
Jody Shelley
James Sheppard
Zach Sill
Jon Sim
Bobby Smith
Colin White
Matthew Highmore
Ryan Graves

Women 

Jillian Saulnier
Blayre Turnbull

Sports journalists

Alex J. Walling

Cross-country skiers
Sue Holloway

Swimmers
Nancy Garapick
Sandy Goss

Track and field athletes
Duncan Gillis
Aileen Meagher

Professional wrestlers
Rocky Johnson
Great Antonio

Powerlifters
John "Jackie" Barrett

Suffragettes

Writers

John Boileau (born in New Brunswick, but writing career in Nova Scotia)
Ernest Buckler
Lesley Choyce
George Elliott Clarke
Darren Greer
Thomas Chandler Haliburton
Wendy Lill
Hugh MacLennan
Alistair MacLeod (born in Saskatchewan, but lived a significant amount of time in, wrote about, and was buried in, Cape Breton, Nova Scotia)
Leo McKay Jr.
Adriana Porter
Thomas Head Raddall
Spider Robinson (1970s and '80s)
Margaret Marshall Saunders
John Stiles
Michael Ernest Sweet
Budge Wilson
Maria Frances Ann Morris

See also
Black Nova Scotians
List of people from the Halifax Regional Municipality
List of people from Yarmouth County, Nova Scotia
Christopher Cross Griffin

References

 Nova Scotians